Hugo Mark Fisher (April 30, 1921 – July 8, 2015) was an American judge and politician. He served as a Democratic member for the 40th district of the California State Senate.

Life and career 
Fisher was born in San Diego, California. He attended San Diego High School. He also attended San Diego State University and Alliant International University.

In 1958, Fisher was elected to represent the 40th district of the California State Senate. He was a campaign manager for John F. Kennedy in 1960. In two years, he was succeeded by Jack Schrade.

In 1966, Fisher was appointed by California Governon Pat Brown to serve as a judge in the superior court in San Diego, California. He served until 1983.

Fisher died in July 2015 in San Diego, California, at the age of 94.

References 

1921 births
2015 deaths
Politicians from San Diego
Democratic Party California state senators
20th-century American politicians
California state court judges
20th-century American judges
San Diego State University alumni
Alliant International University alumni
American campaign managers

San Diego High School alumni